The Fiat–Revelli 35 was an Italian machine gun, a modified version of the Fiat–Revelli Modello 1914, which had equipped the Italian Army of World War I.

Overview

The gun has an overall length of 1700 mm, including its 650 mm barrel. Unloaded, the gun weighs 17 kg, while the tripod weighed 23 kg. Like the Modello 1914, the Modello 35 is a complete weapon system made up of the machine gun unit, the tripod mounting assembly and ammunition supply, and therefore required a multi-person crew to operate.

The Modello 1914 had seen widespread use during the World War I, but its flaws (excessive weight, water-cooling and its use of the underpowered 6.5x52mm Carcano) became more and more apparent as time passed; while the Italian Army was beginning to develop the new Breda M37, it was seen convenient to modernize the many Modello 1914s still existent. The Modello 35 opted for a more conventional belt feed, air-cooling, rechambering for the 8x59mm RB Breda and, after an unsuccessful attempt, discarding an oil pump to lubricate the bullets as on the Breda 30 light machine gun (but some sources claim that, as the Modello 1914, this weapon still featured this troublesome design, which is not mentioned in any of the technical manuals). Also, the machine gun was prone to the cook-off of the chambered rounds during the pauses of firing.

The rechambering to the 8mm calibre and the adoption of a belt feed succeeded in improving both the stopping power and the rate of fire of the machine-gun; however, it reportedly suffered from jammings rather often.

See also
 Breda M37

Notes and references

External links
 https://www.forgottenweapons.com/wp-content/uploads/Fiat%20Revelli/Fiat-Revelli%201935%20Manual%20(Italian,%201941).pdf

World War II infantry weapons of Italy
World War II machine guns
Heavy machine guns
Machine guns of Italy
8×59mm RB Breda machine guns